Lee Hoe-taek (born August 28, 1993), better known as Hui, is a South Korean singer, songwriter and composer. He debuted as the leader, main vocalist and lead dancer of boy group Pentagon in October 2016, under Cube Entertainment. He was a member of the co-ed trio Triple H, alongside former bandmate Dawn and former labelmate Hyuna, and is the leader of trot boy group Super Five of MBC's Favorite Entertainment.

Hui participates in writing and producing a majority of Pentagon's songs. Some of his best-known works are Wanna One's "Energetic", Nation's Son's "Never", Produce X 101's "Boyness", JO1's "Oh-Eh-Oh", and Pentagon's "Shine", "Naughty Boy", and "Daisy".

Name 
At Pentagon's debut showcase, Hui explained the meaning behind his name: believing Lee Hoe-taek, his real name, is difficult to pronounce (particularly for foreigners), he settled on Hui as a mononym. During a stay in China, he discovered local people pronounce the first syllable of his name, Hoe/Hwe, as “Hui/Hwee”, which inspired his decision.

Early life and education 
Hui was born on August 28, 1993, in Gwacheon, Gyeonggi-do Province, South Korea. In 2012, Hui graduated from Modern K Academy. On Comedian Singer Producer, Hui confessed that he was rejected from Hanyang University. He lived in Beijing, China for eight months before joining Cube in 2013.

Career

Pre-debut 
Hui used to be a JYP trainee before joining Cube Entertainment. In 2010, he won first place on Best Male Vocal at JYP 7th Audition Final Round. In 2013, Hui was preparing to debut in China. He failed to make the cut into Chinese Idol as he was placed 60th and immediately dropped out from the show. In an open audition in 2013, after leaving JYP, he was the only participant selected by all three entertainment agencies (Cube, Sonic Music and Nega Network). In December 2013, Hui danced at the KBS Festival and danced to the special stage of Son Dong-woon and Kwon So-hyun. In 2014, Hui appeared in G.NA’s "Secret" music video and promotional activities. He also appeared in Rain's "Rain Effect" as a trainee, and received advice from Rain about debut. Hui spent about six years as a trainee before debuting with Pentagon. In February 2015, Hui was part of a vocal project group, Seorin-dong Children (서린동 아이들) with Jinho and another female singer. The group wasn't supposed to consist of them, but after the three recorded the guide, Cube's Artist Development team decided to release it.

2016–2019: Debut with Pentagon and solo activities 

On October 10, 2016, Hui made his official debut as a member of Pentagon through 2016 Mnet's reality show Pentagon Maker and becoming the leader of the group. He made a cameo on the web drama Spark.

On April 4, 2017, Cube Entertainment announced that he would participate in a project group called Triple H alongside Hyuna and E'dawn and that they would star in a reality show called Triple H Fun Agency. The group debuted on May 1 with the EP 199X and title track "365 Fresh".

In 2017, Hui co-composed the Produce 101 Season 2 hit song, "Never" and Wanna One's debut single, "Energetic" alongside Flow Blow which won by public votes on which song they'd like to see for the group's debut single. Both songs achieved an all-kill on Instiz, charting at No. 1 on real-time charts of Melon, Mnet, Bugs, Genie, Soribada, and Naver.

On September 19, it was revealed that Hui participated in a new show called Hyena on the Keyboard. It is a pilot music variety show where well-known singer-songwriters would be competing on music charts. On October 20, Hui was cast for One Night Food Trip alongside his label mate Yoo Seon-ho. The filming started in Vietnam on October 22.

In just 2018, Hui co-composed Kriesha Chu's "Paradise", "This Stop", Shinwha's "Don't Leave Me, Pentagon's "Shine" and three songs from Thumbs Up! respectively. On June 9, two Cube Entertainment idol groups, Pentagon and (G)I-dle appeared on Idol Room. During the episode, Hui performed his self-produced track, "Theme song 1" alongside Jeon So-yeon's "Theme song 2", and they gifted the song to the show. At the end of 2018, he collaborated with Jinho and Oh My Girl's Seunghee at the 2018 Korea Popular Music Awards to perform a cover of "I Have a Dream" on December 20.

In May 2019, Hui produced "Dramatic" for the rookie girl group Bvndit. In October, he co-wrote and co-composed the song "119" from VAV's fifth EP Poison.

2020–present: Super Five, musical debut, and Boys Planet
In 2020, Hui co-composed three songs from Pentagon's Universe: The Black Hall. He revealed that he wrote the lead single "Dr. Bebe" in a day while "Shower of Rain" he wrote it without any thoughts. On February 29, he performed Jung Soo-ra's "Exultation" on KBS' program Immortal Songs 2 as a duo with Jinho. Hui appeared on Stark's Idol Cooking Class alongside teammate Hongseok, Shinwon and Kino. He also appeared on Mnet's music talk show Studio Music Hall 2, which aired on March 24. He was introduced as "genius music producer" performing his rearranged rock version of Itzy's "Dalla Dalla" and a duet of Kim Kwang-seok's "At About Thirty". On March 28, he was featured on the song "Shout Out" from album Spirit Bomb, a full-length album by Han Yo-han.

On July 11, 2020, it was revealed that Hui appeared on MBC's Favorite Entertainment, a music variety program that aims to create a top trot boy group. In that episode, the judges were video screening from numerous applicants. In the third episode on the show, Hui auditioned with Sim Soo-bong's "I Don't Know Anything But Love" and performed a dance cover of "Gang" by Rain. He passed and received a total of 7 ddabong (thumbs up) from judges Jang Yoon-jeong, comedian Kim Shin-young and Super Junior's Leeteuk. Hui was selected as one of the five members of the idol trot group alongside Astro's MJ, Ok Jin-wook, A.cian's Chu Hyeok-jin and Park Hyeong-seok. On August 15, the project group released a pre-debut digital single titled "Hello" (잘 될 거야) under the name Super Five (다섯장) while using his real name Lee Hoe Taek. They held their debut stage on MBC's Show! Music Core with "All Eyes On Me" and "Hello" on August 22. An accompanying music video for the song was uploaded onto MBC's YouTube channel on August 29. On September 19, they held their final concert Hello, Goodbye Concert before their indefinite disbandment. The concert featured many of the group's summer promotion songs, special stages including duet performances with the 'Favorite Entertainment' hosts. Hui also performed his solo project song, "Step by Step" (한 걸음 한 걸음) in the concert.

On July 22, it was announced that Hui would make his musical debut in a psychological thriller musical Sonata of a Flame (광염 소나타) as J, a composer who suffers from anxiety due to he was unable to produce any single piece. However, only by eye-witnessing someone's death, he was able to write a beautiful melody. The musical ran from August 15 to 30 at Uniplex Hall 1, Seoul, and a live stage will be broadcast online to the US, Japan, and South East Asia starting September.

On August 5, Cube Entertainment confirmed with news outlet TV Report that Hui took part in composing JO1's song "Oh-Eh-Oh". The group performed the song for the first time on Fuji TV's prime-time music program Hey!Hey!Neo! Music Champ on August 1, and it is the title track to their second single Stargazer, that was released on August 26. In addition to Hui's participation in composition, JO1's center Ren Kawashiri and Pentagon's ties attract the public's attention. Before the audition for Produce 101 Japan, he participated as a dancer during Dear Cosmo Tour. The song ranked at number one and thirty-three on Billboard Japan Hot 100 and Top Download Songs, respectively.

Hui has been included in a lineup of 45 top singers in music genres ranging from pop, classic, musical etc., who will be featuring on MBN's new concept variety music game show, Lotto Singer. The show was first aired on September 19. He and Flow Blow produced the title song for WEi's debut album Identity : First Sight entitled "Twilight". On December 16, it was confirmed that he would be producing a song for the Top 7 competition on Mnet's audition show CAP-TEEN. The ballad song, "White Butterfly", was sung by contestant Kim Han-byul, who placed second overall.

Mandatory military service 
On October 19, 2020, Cube announced that Hui is enlisting in the mandatory military service as a social worker on December 3. He is the second Pentagon member to fulfill his defense duties after Jinho, who began his service in May. On December 2, Cube shared that Hui's enlistment was delayed as he was self-isolating due to being in an area where someone had contracted COVID-19. The following day, it was announced that he will fulfill his duties as a member of Pentagon (including the We L:ve Online Concert on December 13) until his scheduled enlistment date was announced. Almost two months later, Cube announced that Hui would be enlisting as a social worker on February 18, 2021.Hui was discharged from military service as a social worker on November 17, 2022. 

On June 17, 2021, Hui released the song "Imagine" as the first OST for the drama Monthly Magazine Home. He wrote and co-produced CIX's promotional single "Tesseract" for the app Universe, which was released on July 1.

Boys Planet
Since February 2023, Hui is a contestant on Boys Planet using his real name, Lee Hoe-taek. He was ranked the 7th in the first ranking reveal.

Artistry

Influence
Hui is called an "all-rounder" idol, and is frequently praised for his vocal, acting, songwriting, producing, and composing skills. He has earned the nickname "genius producer", as he frequently produces songs for Pentagon, himself, and other artists. Hui is seen as a role model for his abilities as a vocalist and a producer-idol to other idols, including Yoo Seon-ho, DKB's Teo, MustB's Doha, and BDC's Junghwan.<ref>{{Cite web|last=Kim|first=Min-ji|date=2021-06-30|title='컴백' BDC 확신 가지라'는 라이머 대표님, 든든…실력돌 되고파' [N인터뷰]|url=https://www.news1.kr/articles/4354469|url-status=live|access-date=2021-07-15|website=News1|language=ko|archive-date=July 15, 2021|archive-url=https://web.archive.org/web/20210715103714/https://www.news1.kr/articles/4354469}}</ref>

Songwriting and musical style

In an episode of TMI News'', Hui revealed that he arrange songs in his sleep. "I seem to get more stressed than I realize, because I’ve been arranging songs in my dreams. My members keep waking up to the sound of me singing. I’ve been singing in my sleep."

Discography

As Lee Hoe-taek of Super Five

Filmography

Web drama

Variety shows

Musical

Notes

References

External links

1993 births
Living people
People from Gwacheon
South Korean pop singers
21st-century South Korean  male singers
South Korean male idols
Cube Entertainment artists
Pentagon (South Korean band) members
Boys Planet contestants
South Korean male singer-songwriters
Hui (singer)